Steyer is a German-language surname. Notable individuals with the surname include:

  (born 1946), German actor and musician
  (1842–1900), German politician, MdL
  (1834–1887), German politician, MdL
  (1909–1944), German footballer
 Heinz-Steyer-Stadion, a football and athletics stadium in Dresden
 Jim Steyer (born 1956), American child advocate
  (1630–1692), Czech Jesuit, preacher, educator, translator and author
  (1839–1907), German landowner and politician, MdL
 Sebastian Steyer (born 1980), Polish professional darts player
 Tom Steyer (born 1957), American asset manager, philanthropist and environmentalist
 Włodzimierz Steyer (1892–1957), Polish naval officer and a Counter Admiral of the Polish Navy

See also 
 Steyr
 Steyrer
Steer (surname)

German-language surnames